Fastjet Zimbabwe Limited, also known and styled as fastjet Zimbabwe, is a low-cost airline that has been incorporated to operate flights under the fastjet brand in Zimbabwe. It is the second locally incorporated airline to operate under the fastjet brand, following the example of Fastjet Tanzania.

History
Fastjet's first flights to Zimbabwe were operated by Fastjet Tanzania, between Harare International Airport and Dar es Salaam's Julius Nyerere International Airport, and commenced in August 2014.

Fastjet announced on 25 March 2015 that it had received an Air Service Permit (ASP) from the Ministry of Transport and Infrastructural Development of the Government of Zimbabwe, responsible for administering the Civil Aviation Authority of Zimbabwe (CAAZ). Fastjet then obtained an Air Operator's Certificate (AOC) on 6 October 2015, and announced its plans to launch fastjet Zimbabwe, with initial flights between its base at Harare International Airport and Victoria Falls. Flights were planned to expand to other destinations, including domestically to Bulawayo and then internationally.

On 18 January 2016, Fastjet Zimbabwe declared its first international route between Harare and Johannesburg, to be served daily from 1 February 2016.

As part of the Stabilisation Plan of Fastjet plc from August 2016, which included a move to smaller aircraft across the Group, the single Airbus A319 based in Zimbabwe was replaced by (at first) one Embraer E145 aircraft.  A second E145 was utilised from July 2017, with an increase in the number of routes and flights.

Corporate affairs

Ownership
Fastjet Zimbabwe is a Zimbabwean-registered company that is 49% owned by Fastjet Plc. Fastjet Zimbabwe has a local board of directors, and meets all the required nationality standards under which it can be named by the Zimbabwean CAA as a designated airline to fly to other countries under the usual bilateral air services agreements.

Business trends
Fastjet Zimbabwe began operating in October 2015.  Financial results are incorporated in the Fastjet Plc group accounts, and some information has been made available for the Zimbabwe operation (as at period ending 31 December):

Head office
Fastjet Zimbabwe maintains its head office in Harare; the registered office is Harare International Airport, Harare.

Destinations

As of March 2022, Fastjet Zimbabwe serves the following destinations:

Fleet

Current fleet
The Fastjet Zimbabwe fleet consists of the following aircraft as of June 2020:

Historical fleet
Fastjet Zimbabwe initially operated an Airbus A319-100 aircraft.

See also
 List of airlines of Zimbabwe

References

External links

Official website (mobile)

Airlines established in 2015
Low-cost carriers
Airlines of Zimbabwe
2015 establishments in Zimbabwe
Companies based in Harare